Ust-Luga (lit. mouth of the Luga, Votian: Laugasuu, lit. mouth of the Luga) is a settlement and railway station in Kingiseppsky District of Leningrad Oblast, Russia, near the Estonian border, situated on the Luga River near its entry into the Luga Bay of the Gulf of Finland, about  west of St. Petersburg.

Port of Ust-Luga and multimodal complex
Ust-Luga is the site of an important coal and fertiliser terminal, constructed at a cost of $2.1 billion. Construction works started in 1997, in part to avoid dry cargo shipments through the Baltic States, and were accelerated at the urging of President Vladimir Putin, who inaugurated the new port facilities in 2001. The 3,700-metre  approach canal is deep and capable of accommodating ships with a capacity of 150,000 tonnes and more. In May 2008, Putin confirmed that Ust-Luga will be the final point of the projected Second Baltic Pipeline, an oil transportation route bypassing Belarus.

The Ust-Luga container terminal was launched in December 2011. It is operated by the National Container Company.

The port adjoins a Ust-Luga Multimodal Complex, which allows for speedy freight handling.

In 2018, the port handled 98.7 million tonnes of cargo.

In October 2021, Gazprom and RusGazDobycha announced they would build a plant to process ethane-containing natural gas and a large-scale liquefied natural gas (LNG) production plant, Baltic LNG, with a capacity of 13 million tons of LNG per year. High-ethane gas from the Tambeyskoye gas field and the Achimov and Valanginian deposits of the Nadym-Pur-Taz region will supply the plant.

Population
As of 2005, the population of Ust-Luga does not exceed 2,000, but the port administration expects it to grow to 34,000 by 2025.

References

External links

Ust-Luga Sea Port

Rural localities in Leningrad Oblast
Port cities and towns in Russia